Hugo Knudsen was a Danish printer, born in 1876 and died in 1955, eponym of the Knudsen process for fine lithography, patented in 1915. He owned the Offset Printing Plate Company of New York, United States.

Knudsen invented and developed the lithographic halftone printing process which is still in use today, and at the time it was superior to any other known method of photo and picture  reproduction.  This process was used by Edward Steichen.

Knudsen was close friend (and brother-in-law) of Alfred Kreymborg. He was married to Beatrice (Bea) Bloom.

References

External links
 The Inter-Society Color Council records at Hagley Museum and Library contain the Hugo Knudesen papers.
 A.C. Austin, 'An Outline of the Knudsen Process' : https://www.philobiblon.com/vassos/knudsen.htm
 JOSEPHY, Robert S. "The Development of Printing by Offset Lithography With especial reference to the Knudsen Process", The Publishers' Weekly. The American Book Trade Journal 117/18 (1930), pp. 2343-2345. : https://archive.org/details/sim_publishers-weekly_1930-05-03_117_18/page/2342

American printers
Year of birth missing
Year of death missing